Ceroplesis revoili is a species of beetle in the family Cerambycidae. It was described by Fairmaire in 1882. It is known from Kenya, Ethiopia, Tanzania, and Somalia.

Subspecies
 Ceroplesis revoili pauli Fairmaire, 1884
 Ceroplesis revoili revoili Fairmaire, 1882

References

revoili
Beetles described in 1882